Palani railway station is a single-electric lined train station serving Tamil Nadu's pilgrim town of Palani situated in the western part of the state. The station is a part of the Madurai railway division of the Southern Railway zone and falls on the Pollachi–Dindigul section.

Electrification
From Palakkad Junction till this station, this line has been converted from single-diesel line to single-electric line. These include stations like Palakkad Town, Minatchipuram, Pollachi Jn, Udumalaipettai and Palani. On 13 September 2022, Palani – Dindigul Junction CRS inspection was conducted and soon this stretch consisting of these stations, Chattrapatti, Oddanchatram and Akkaraipatti will be converted from single-diesel Line to single-electric line, respectively.

Trains
The train services running currently through Palani Railway Station are as follows:-

Superfast Trains
 22651 - MGR Chennai Central (MAS) to Palakkad Junction (PGT)
 22652 - Palakkad Junction (PGT) to MGR Chennai Central (MAS)

Mail/Express Trains
 06029 - Mettupalayam (MTP) to Tirunelveli Jn (TEN) via Tenkasi Jn (TSI)
 06030 - Tirunelveli Jn (TEN) to Mettupalayam (MTP) via Tenkasi Jn (TSI)
 16343 - Amritha Express (Trivandrum Jn (TVC) to Madurai Jn (MDU))
 16344 - Amritha Express (Madurai Jn (MDU) to Trivandrum Jn (TVC))
 16731 - Palakkad Junction (PGT) to Thiruchendur (TCN)
 16732 - Thiruchendur (TCN) to Palakkad Junction (PGT)
 16731/32 - PGT to TEN pulled by Electric locomotive and from TEN to TCN pulled by Diesel locomotive

Unreserved Trains
 16722/16721 - Intercity Express - Madurai Jn (MDU) to Coimbatore Junction (CBE) via Palani (PLNI) 
 56608 - Palani (PLNI) to Coimbatore Junction (CBE) (passenger)
 56623 - Palani (PLNI) to Madurai (MDU) (passenger)

Gallery
The timeline of Palani Railway Station from 2008 to 2021:-

References

External links
 Indiarailinfo

Madurai railway division
Railway stations in Dindigul district